Emanuel Alejandro García (born 6 July 1990) is an Argentine footballer who plays as a midfielder. He is currently a free agent.

Career
García started his career with Rosario Central, joining the club in 2004 following a trial in the previous year. He made his professional bow on 22 November 2008 during a home defeat to Independiente, prior to also starting fixtures in December against Tigre and Godoy Cruz; with the midfielder being sent off in the latter match. García remained for two further seasons, the first of which ended with relegation in 2009–10, but didn't make any more appearances; appearing on the bench just once, in May 2011 versus Unión Santa Fe. 2011 saw García secure a move to Mitre of Torneo Argentino B, before moving to Torneo Argentino A in 2012 with Argentino.

Career statistics
.

References

External links

1990 births
Living people
People from Diamante Department
Argentine footballers
Association football midfielders
Argentine Primera División players
Torneo Argentino B players
Torneo Argentino A players
Rosario Central footballers
Club Atlético Mitre footballers
Argentino de Rosario footballers
Sportspeople from Entre Ríos Province